Dancing Machine  is a 1973 song recorded by The Jackson 5.

Dancing Machine may also refer to:

Dancing Machine (album), a 1973 album recorded by The Jackson 5
Gene Gene the Dancing Machine (1932–2015), occasional performer on American talent show The Gong Show
Dancing Machine (film), a 1990 French thriller film

See also
Dance Machine, an American dance game show and competition
VH1 Dance Machine, a half-hour music video program
Dancing (disambiguation)